Bear Lake is located north of Kelly Corners, New York. Fish species present in the lake are largemouth bass, northern pike, smallmouth bass, pumpkinseed sunfish, bluegill, tiger muskie, muskellunge, walleye, yellow perch, and black bullhead. There is a state owned hand launch located on the east shore off Bear Lake Road.

References 

Lakes of Chautauqua County, New York
Lakes of New York (state)